Clive Freeman (born 12 September 1962) is an English former footballer who played as a left sided attacking full-back or midfielder, most notably for Altrincham, and who has since served as a coach and assistant manager at Guiseley A.F.C., Buxton FC, Ossett Town and Goole A.F.C.

He famously scored the November 1992 BBC Goal of the Month for Altrincham F.C. against Chester City F.C. in the second round of the FA Cup, and was noted for his ball striking ability from range and at set pieces.

Career
Freeman started his career in the lower leagues, appearing for Collingham, Farsley Celtic and Doncaster Rovers, before joining Bridlington where he was an FA Vase finalist. He was signed for Swansea by Terry Yorath but was unable to force his way into the team, and so went to Carlisle on loan. After being released by Swansea in the summer of 1992, he attended successful trials at Altrincham where he signed permanently. He was a first team regular in an unfamiliar position of left-back, but made significant contributions to the club with important goals. Despite finishing top scorer he was released, and joined Doncaster Rovers where he stayed for one season. He subsequently returned to non-league football with A.F.C. Emley, Bradford Park Avenue and Guiseley where he was later player-coach, and assistant manager.

References 

Living people
English footballers
Association football fullbacks
Swansea City A.F.C. players
Carlisle United F.C. players
Altrincham F.C. players
Doncaster Rovers F.C. players
English Football League players
1962 births
Footballers from Leeds